HSW may refer to:

 Hall School Wimbledon, in Wimbledon, London, England
 Harvard Business School, Stanford Graduate School of Business and Wharton School of the University of Pennsylvania, often considered the three top business schools worldwide and referred to together when referencing their cachet or desirability
 Haswell (microarchitecture)
 Health and Safety at Work etc. Act 1974, of the United Kingdom
 Hellenic Seaways, a Greek ferry operator
 Heswall railway station, in England
 Historical Society of Washington, D.C.
 Howard Scott Warshaw (born 1957), American game designer
 HowStuffWorks, a website
 HSW International, now Remark Media
 HSW Łuczniczka, a stadium in Bydgoszcz, Poland
Hungry Shark World, a video game published by Ubisoft.
 Huta Stalowa Wola S.A., a Polish steel mill